The 2003 Formula Ford Zetec Championship Series was the third USF2000 Ford Zetec championship. PR1 Motorsports driver Jonathan Bomarito took the title in a Van Diemen RF03.

Race calendar and results

Notes

Final standings

References

2003 in American motorsport